The men's handball tournament of the 1987 All-Africa Games were held in Nairobi, Kenya in August 1987.

Qualified teams

Squads

: Mohamed Maachou (GK), Mohamed Hachemi (GK), Bachir Dib (GK),  Soufiane Khalfallah, Sid Ahmed Tekfa, Abdelkrim Chouchaoui, Fethnour Lacheheb, Salahedine Agrane, Nabil Rouabhi, Benali Beghouach, Nouredine Khelil, Abdeldjalil Bouanani, Mounir Ben Merabet, Hassen Aït Abdeslem, Sid Ahmed Ledraa, Mokrane Gherbi. Coach : Fodil Hassen Khodja.

Group stage

Group A

Group B
Mozambique withdrew

Knockout stage

Final ranking

References

 
1987 All-Africa Games
1987
African Games
Handball